Sudbury East was a provincial electoral riding in the Canadian province of Ontario, that was represented in the Legislative Assembly of Ontario from 1967 to 1999. It served the easternmost portion of the former city of Sudbury, the eastern portion of the Regional Municipality of Sudbury, and several rural communities to the east and southeast of the city. The riding only existed in provincial elections — for federal elections, most of Sudbury East was part of either Nickel Belt or Timiskaming—French River.

In 1999, the provincial government realigned its ridings to match the federal riding boundaries, and Sudbury East was amalgamated into the provincial Nickel Belt district. Shelley Martel, the incumbent MPP for Sudbury East prior to the 1999 election, continued to represent the region for another eight years as the MPP for Nickel Belt.

Members of Provincial Parliament

Other usages
The name Sudbury East is still used to refer collectively to the municipalities east and southeast of the city which were formerly part of the riding but are not part of the current city of Greater Sudbury, including Markstay-Warren, St. Charles and French River. These towns, as well as the adjacent municipality of Killarney and the unorganized townships of Burwash, Cox, Davis, Hawley, Hendrie, Henry, Janes, Laura, Loughrin, Secord, Servos, Street and Waldie, coordinate economic development and planning through the cooperative Sudbury East Planning Board.

In unofficial usage, the designation may also be extended to include the municipality of West Nipissing, particularly the community of Sturgeon Falls, although West Nipissing is not officially part of the Sudbury East area.

References

External links
 SudburyEast.com, a web portal for residents of the Sudbury East region

Former provincial electoral districts of Ontario
Sudbury District
Politics of Greater Sudbury